Tuomas Pihlman (born November 13, 1982) is a Finnish former professional ice hockey Left Wing who played in the Finnish Liiga with JYP Jyväskylä. He also played in 15 games for the New Jersey Devils in the National Hockey League (NHL).

Playing career
Pihlman was drafted by the New Jersey Devils in the 2nd round, 48th overall, in the 2001 NHL Entry Draft. He played a total of 15 NHL games over three seasons, 2003–04, 2005–06 and 2006–07.

He was not offered a new contract after the 2016–17 season and officially announced his retirement in October 2017.

Career statistics

Regular season and playoffs

International

References

External links

1982 births
Living people
Albany River Rats players
Ässät players
Finnish ice hockey left wingers
Jokerit players
JYP-Akatemia players
JYP Jyväskylä players
Lowell Devils players
New Jersey Devils draft picks
New Jersey Devils players
Sportspeople from Espoo